Baccaurea macrocarpa, also called tampoi, is a small, tropical rainforest substorey fruit trees native to Southeast Asia, especially Borneo. It is dioecious, and the female tree bear fruit directly on the trunk and large branches. The fruit is large, orange-skinned, white-fleshed, with a delicious tangy flavour somewhat like mandarin (tangerine). Depending on conditions, the fruit may closely clothe the trunk beautifully, like the fruit of many Ficus species.

References 

macrocarpa